Swede Lake is a lake in Carver County, Minnesota, in the United States.

Several Swedish immigrants settled at Swede Lake, causing its name to be selected.

References

Lakes of Minnesota
Lakes of Carver County, Minnesota